The North Eastern Railway (abbreviated NER) is one of the 18 railway zones of Indian Railways. It is headquartered at Gorakhpur.

Zonal Rail Training Institute (ZRTI) is established in district Ghazipur, Uttar Pradesh.

North Eastern Railway is one of the most important transit zones, that is, it is used to take in loaded wagons, especially food grains, from Northern Railway divisions like Firozpur, and move it towards Eastern belt and the Northern Frontier region (Seven Sister States). Thus, it acts as an essential cog in the food security of the country. Apart from being an important transit zone, it is also at the center-stage for much inward traffic from the neighboring zones. The inward traffic comprises food grains, fertiliser, stone chips, cement, petroleum, coal, etc.

As North Eastern Railway caters to a large area spread from the western part of Uttar Pradesh towards eastern Uttar Pradesh and area comprising western Bihar, it runs many passenger trains for the economically weaker sections. Thus, in its true sense, North Eastern Railway is delivering on the balance between social as well commercial objective of the Indian Railways.

History 

The North Eastern Railway was formed on 14 April 1952 by combining two railway systems the Oudh and Tirhut Railway and Assam Railway and the Cawnpore–Achnera Provincial State Railway of the Bombay, Baroda and Central India Railway. The Cawnpore–Barabanki Railway was transferred to the North Eastern Railway on 27 February 1953. NER was bifurcated into two Railway Zones on 15 January 1958, the North Eastern Railway and the Northeast Frontier Railway and all lines east of Katihar were transferred to Northeast Frontier Railway.

By December 2017, railways for the first time installed 6,095 GPS-enabled "Fog Pilot Assistance System" railway signalling devices in four most affected zones, Northern Railway zone, North Central Railway zone, North Eastern Railway zone and North Western Railway zone, by doing away with the old practice of putting firecrackers on train tracks to alert train divers running trains on snail's pace. With these devices, train pilots precisely know in advance, about the location of signals, level-crossing gates and other such approaching markers.

Divisions
 Lucknow NER railway division
 Varanasi railway division
 Izzatnagar railway division

Major stations in North Eastern Railway zone

Area covered
NER  UP & Bihar also Nepal border in three part with three division work (Varanasi, Lucknow & Izzatnagar).
1 Western Uttar Pradesh as (Mathura, Kasganj, Farrukhabad, Kanpur etc.).
2 Northern Uttar Pradesh & Awadh as (Kathgodam, Bareilly, Pilibhit, Lakhimpur Kheri Lucknow, Gonda, Ayodhya etc.).
3 All purvanchal region & North western Bihar as (Gorakhpur, Jaunpur, Azamgarh, Varanasi, Allahabad, Mau, Chapra etc.)

Re-organisation 
On 1 October 2002, Samastipur and Sonpur divisions were transferred to East Central Railway. The present N. E. Railway (NER), after re-organisation of Railway Zones in 2002, comprises three Divisions - Varanasi, Lucknow and Izzatnagar. NER has 3,402.46 route km with 486 stations. NER primarily serves the areas of Uttar Pradesh, Uttarakhand and Western districts of Bihar.

Administration 
The administrative head of the zone is called General Manager, currently Shri Ashok Kumar Mishra    (01/07/2022).

Routes

Express routes
Gorakhpur-LTT (Mumbai) SF Express (Via Gonda Junction, Aishbagh, Kanpur central)

Loco sheds

 Diesel & Electric Loco Shed, Gonda
 Diesel Loco Shed, Izzatnagar
 Electric Loco Shed, Gorakhpur

Cultural importance 
North Eastern Railway passes through/connects to many important tourist and cultural centres like Varanasi, Sarnath, Lucknow, Allahabad, Gorakhpur, Kushinagar, Lumbani, Ghazipur City, Mau, Ballia, Suraimanpur Deoria, Siddhart Nagar, Basti, Mathura, Vrindavan, Maunath Bhanjan, Azamgarh, Jaunpur, Faizabad, Nainital, Ranikhet, Pilibhit tiger reserve, Kausani and Dudhwa and Maharajganj, Nautanwa and Sonauli.

See also

 All India Station Masters' Association (AISMA)
 Zones and divisions of Indian Railways

References

External links 
 
 North Eastern Railway Recruitment
North Eastern Railway Official Site
 North Eastern Railway

Zones of Indian Railways
 
Rail transport in Uttar Pradesh